Pianello del Lario is a comune (municipality) in the Province of Como in the Italian region Lombardy, located about  north of Milan and about  northeast of Como.

Pianello del Lario borders the following municipalities: Colico, Cremia, Dervio, Dongo, Dorio, Garzeno, Musso.

References

Cities and towns in Lombardy